The Strange Case of Angelica is a 2010 Portuguese drama film directed by Manoel de Oliveira. It was entered into the Un Certain Regard section of the 2010 Cannes Film Festival.  De Oliveira conceived the idea for the film in 1946 and initially wrote the script in 1952, updating it with modern elements.

Plot
In Portugal, in the years 2000, Isaac, a young Sefardic photographer rents an apartment in a modest pension of Senhora Justina, in Peso da Régua. On a rainy night, he is suddenly woken up to help a wealthy family in an extraordinary task: to take the last portrait of their daughter, Angélica, a young woman who has died soon after her own wedding. Upon his arrival to Quinta das Portas, Isaac encounters a family in mourning for the young woman. In one of the chambers, the photographer discovers Angélica and is dazzled by her beauty. In the moment when the view through the lens becomes focused, Angélica seems bringing back to life specially for him. For a few seconds, she gives a wink and smiles.

The next day, the photographer returns to the activity that brought him to the Douro region and goes out to document the old methods of working in the vineyards, with special attention to the so-called "earth diggers". But Isaac cannot forget the image of Angelica and feels magically haunted by the young woman. He lives in pursuit of the enchanting power of the successive apparitions of Angélica's ghost, which leave him deeply in love. Gradually, the photographer becomes exhausted and more and more distances himself from the environment that surrounds him and from life and social routine, until he ends up succumbing without apparent explanation.

Cast
 Pilar López de Ayala as Angélica
 Filipe Vargas as Marido
 Ricardo Trêpa as Isaac
 Leonor Silveira as Mother
 Ana Maria Magalhães as Clementina
 Isabel Ruth as Doméstica
 Luís Miguel Cintra as Engineer
 Ricardo Aibéo
 Paulo Matos as Homem da Gabardine
 Adelaide Teixeira as Justina

Reception
Keith Uhlich of Time Out New York named The Strange Case of Angelica the sixth-best film of 2010, calling it "the greatest man-falls-in-love-with-a-ghost story ever directed by a 101-year-old."

In France, Cahiers du Cinéma listed it as the second-best film of 2011. Cahiers later named The Strange Case of Angelica the tenth-best film of the 2010s.

References

External links
 
 
 
 
 The Strange Case of Angelica at Metacritic
 

2010 films
Portuguese drama films
2010s Portuguese-language films
2010 drama films
Films directed by Manoel de Oliveira